Alessandro Picardi (born 1977) is an Italian manager.

Biography 
Alessandro Picardi is an executive manager. Currently is President Executive of Olivetti, Executive Vice President of Telecom Italia, Chief Public Affairs Officer from 2019 since to April 2022, Past President of Tivù Sat, and is a President Digital Single Market as Vice President of Confindustria Digitale, Vice President of Assolombarda and Asstel and is a member of the General Council of Confindustria Radio Televisioni. Until January 2019 he was of Rai Director of the Strategic Development of Rai platforms and Director of the Institutional and International Relations from 2013 to October 2016 and board member of Auditel from 2015 to 2018.

He graduated in media studies in Rome and he is also a journalist registered in the national list of publicists.

Vice President of Corporate Affairs of Alitalia from 2012 to 2013, Alessandro Picardi has a consolidated experience in the field of telecommunications: he was from December 2006 to August 2012 Head of Institutional Affairs at Wind Telecomunicazioni and previously, from 2004 to November 2006 at Sky Italy he worked as Institutional Affairs and Relations with the Vatican.

He was Chairman of the FUB (Fondazione Ugo Bordoni) committee, culture and research institute with a tradition of research and application studies in the fields of telecommunications and information technology. Short-term board member of “L’Orientale” University of Naples, He was also in the board of directors of Assaereo and Asstel.

Private life 
Alessandro Picardi has been married to Beatrice Lorenzin, former Italian health minister, since September 2016. He is father of Francesco and Lavinia.

References

1977 births
Living people
Italian businesspeople
Italian chairpersons of corporations